Tretuk is a village in the Vardenis Municipality of the Gegharkunik Province of Armenia, located near the border with Azerbaijan. The village was populated by Azerbaijanis before the exodus of Azerbaijanis from Armenia after the outbreak of the Nagorno-Karabakh conflict. In 1988-1989 Armenian refugees deported from Azerbaijan settled in the village.

References 

Populated places in Gegharkunik Province